Olof B. Widlund (born 1938), is a Swedish-American mathematician. He is well known for his leading role in and fundamental contributions to domain decomposition methods. He received his Ph.D. at Uppsala University in 1966 and is professor of Computer Science at the Courant Institute of New York University.

Publications

Recognition
He was included in the 2019 class of fellows of the American Mathematical Society "for contributions to numerical analysis of domain decompositions within computational mathematics and for incubation through his writing and mentorship of a broad international, creative community of practice applied to highly resolved systems simulations".

References

External links

Home page at Courant institute
Fast Algorithms for Scientific Computing A Symposium in Honor of Olof B. Widlund on the Occasion of His 70th Birthday

20th-century American mathematicians
21st-century American mathematicians
Swedish mathematicians
Courant Institute of Mathematical Sciences faculty
American people of Swedish descent
Uppsala University alumni
1938 births
Living people
Fellows of the Society for Industrial and Applied Mathematics
Fellows of the American Mathematical Society